West Richwoods is an unincorporated community in Stone County, Arkansas, United States. The Samuel Brown House and the West Richwoods Church & School, which are both listed on the National Register of Historic Places, are located in West Richwoods.

References

Unincorporated communities in Stone County, Arkansas
Unincorporated communities in Arkansas